The Colt 933 is a compact carbine based on the AR-15, M16 rifle and M4 Carbine produced by Colt starting in 1995. Due to their compact size, the short-barreled Colt 933 continues to be used by various US Special Forces and by some foreign forces, including Israeli Special Forces.

Users 
 
 : Used by SAJ.
 : Used by LAPD Metropolitan Division SWAT and USMC Force Recon.

References

Carbines
Colt rifles